Karia Ba Mohamed is a city in northern Morocco, situated in the Atlas Mountains 58 kilometres northwest of the city of Fes.

Located near the Sebou River, Karia has a population of some 18,000 people and around 2,000 houses. It is a working class farming area.  The view north from the town looks towards Moulay Bouchta and the Rif Mountains in the distance.  There are no hotels or municipal buildings.

The town has a high school, and a central marketplace.  The souk day is Tuesday.  The high school serves students from the surrounding villages.

References

Populated places in Taounate Province